Shaun Wade (born September 15, 1998) is an American football cornerback for the New England Patriots of the National Football League (NFL). A native of Jacksonville, Florida, he attended Trinity Christian Academy and was named USA Today High School Football Defensive Player of the Year as a senior in 2016. 

Wade played college football at Ohio State, where he was named the Tatum–Woodson Defensive Back of the Year and considered a consensus All-American in 2020. He was drafted by the Baltimore Ravens in the fifth round of the 2021 NFL Draft, but was traded to the Patriots before playing a game with them.

Early years
Wade was born on September 15, 1998, and attended Trinity Christian Academy in Jacksonville, Florida. While in high school, Wade's teams won the Florida State Championship all four years that he played. As a senior he was the USA Today High School Football Player of the Year and won the Lockheed Martin defensive back of the year awarded by the U.S. Army All-American Bowl. A five-star recruit, he committed to Ohio State University to play college football.

College career
After redshirting his first year at Ohio State in 2017, Wade played in all 14 games in 2018. He finished the season with 31 tackles and three interceptions. He returned to Ohio State his redshirt sophomore year in 2019. Wade graduated with a Bachelor of Science degree in sports industry.

Professional career

Baltimore Ravens
Wade was drafted by the Baltimore Ravens in the fifth round (160th overall) of the 2021 NFL Draft. He signed his four-year rookie contract on May 12, 2021.

New England Patriots
On August 26, 2021, Wade was traded to the New England Patriots in exchange for a 2022 seventh-round pick and a 2023 fifth-round pick.

References

External links
New England Patriots
Ohio State Buckeyes bio

1998 births
Living people
Players of American football from Jacksonville, Florida
American football cornerbacks
Ohio State Buckeyes football players
All-American college football players
Baltimore Ravens players
New England Patriots players